David Edgari Tonoyan (Armenian:Դավիթ Էդգարի Տոնոյան; born 27 December 1967) is an Armenian political figure and former Defence Minister of Armenia, in office from 2018 to 2020.

Biography

Early life and career 
David Tonoyan was born on December 27, 1967, in the city of Ust-Kamenogorsk (now Oskemen, Kazakhstan), in the East Kazakhstan Region of the Kazakh SSR. He is the grandson of Hovhannes Hakobov, a veteran of the Red Army who took part in the Second World War. In 1986, he joined the Soviet Armed Forces's Transcaucasian Military District. He moved to Yerevan to attend Yerevan State University, which he graduated from in 1991. He entered the Armed Forces of Armenia in 1992. In 1997, he graduated from the Military University of the Ministry of Defence of the Russian Federation. Between 1998 and 2007, Tonoyan held various positions at NATO’s headquarters in Brussels, serving as the Armenian Representative to NATO for three years. In 2007, Tonoyan returned to Armenia to head the departments on international military cooperation and defence policy in the Ministry of Defence.

From 2010 to 2017, Tonoyan served as First Deputy Minister of Defence of Armenia, serving under Seyran Ohanyan and Vigen Sargsyan. On 6 February 2017, he was appointed Minister of Emergency Situations.

Defence minister 
Prime Minister Nikol Pashinyan appointed Tonoyan as defence minister on May 11, 2018, three days after Pashinyan took office.  

In late August 2020, Tonoyan proposed the creation of a national militia in light of the July 2020 Armenian–Azerbaijani clashes, in order to prepare the society to threats of military nature. The Ministry of Defence under his leadership introduced a draft law into the National Assembly creating the militia, which would be open to both men and women and people up to the age of 70, as well as would be organized under local governments, potentially including up to 100,000 members.

2020 Nagorno-Karabakh War and resignation 

In March 2019, at a gathering of Armenian community representatives in New York, Tonoyan declared that "I, as the Defence Minister, say that the option of return of ‘territories for peace’ will no longer exist, and I have re-formulated it into ’new territories in the event of a new war’", criticizing the Madrid Principles which envisioned the peaceful return of the territories surrounding Nagorno-Karabakh to Azerbaijani control. This statement, later popularized as "new war for new territories", was widely criticized and regarded as one of the provocations that ruled out negotiations on Nagorno-Karabakh and later caused 2020 Nagorno-Karabakh war, which resulted in Azerbaijan taking control of the territories surrounding Nagorno-Karabakh, Shusha, Hadrut region, Madagiz, Talish and other parts of the former NKAO.

After the 2020 Nagorno-Karabakh ceasefire agreement was signed, he denied rumors he sold arms to pro-Turkish militants in Syria via a private company, allegations of which appeared in the Armenian media. Related accusations that were also denied was the claim that it turned down an offer to purchase body armor jackets from Russia as well as the claim that Tonoyan was in the Maldives to attend a relative’s birthday party when the war started.

On November 20, 2020 he tendered his resignation. In his farewell address, he apologized to those who lost loved ones during the war.

Arrest 
On 30 September 2021, Tonoyan was arrested by the National Security Service of Armenia and accused of fraud and embezzlement causing nearly 2.3 billion Armenian drams ($4.7 million) worth of damage to the state together with arms dealer Davit Galstyan.

Personal life 
He is currently married and has two children. He is fluent in Russian, English, and French. He is a master of sports in judo.

Awards 
 Order "For Services to the Father''land"
 Medal "For Meritorious Service"
 Vazgen Sargsyan Medal
 Andranik Ozanyan Medal

References 

1967 births
Living people
Defence ministers of Armenia
Kazakhstani people of Armenian descent
Soviet Armenians
People from Oskemen